Evergrande International Financial Center T1 (also referred to as Evergrande IFC Main Tower) is a skyscraper on hold in Hefei, China. Once completed it would be the tallest building in Anhui province and one of the tallest buildings in the world. 

The design of the building was inspired by bamboo.

See also
 List of tallest buildings
 List of tallest buildings in China

References

Buildings and structures under construction in China